Alley is a surname. Notable people with the surname include:

Anthea Alley (1927–1993), British sculptor
Allen Alley (born 1954), American businessman and politician
Alphonse Alley (1930–1987), Beninese political figure
Bill Alley (1919–2004), Australian cricket player
Cal Alley (1915–1970), American editorial cartoonist
Candice Alley (born 1982), Australian singer-songwriter
Carroll Alley (1928–2016), American physicist
Chelsea Alley (born 1982), New Zealand rugby player
Don Alley (born 1945), American football player
Elizabeth Alley (1955–2013), American actress
Ernest Alley (1904–1971), American football player
Fred Alley (1962–2001), American lyricist
Gene Alley (born 1940), American baseball player
Geoff Alley (1903–1986), New Zealand rugby player
George Alley (died 1912), Irish Methodist
Henry Alley (born 1945), American writer
Jennifer Alley, American basketball coach
Jerome Alley (1760–1826), Irish poet and author
John B. Alley (1817–1896), American politician and businessman
Keirsten Alley (born 1973), American tennis player
Kim Alley (born 1965), American modeling agent
Kirstie Alley (1951–2022), American actress and comedian
Larry Alley (born 1948), American politician
Lindsey Alley (born 1977), American actress and singer
Miko Alley, American-Filipino footballer
Phil Alley (born 1970), Australian cricket player
Rewi Alley (1897–1987), New Zealand writer
Richard Alley (born 1957), American geologist
Rick Alley (born 1963), American poet
Shelly Lee Alley (1894–1964), American singer, musician, songwriter and western swing bandleader
Stephen Alley (1876–1969), British mechanical engineer and secret agent
Steve Alley (born 1953), American ice hockey player
T. W. Alley (born c. 1942), American football player and coach
Taylor Alley, American rugby player
Ted Alley (1881–1949), Australian footballer
Thomas Alley (born 1946), American politician
Tom Alley (1889–1953), American racing driver
Vernon Alley (1915–2004), American jazz musician 
Wayne Alley (born 1932), American judge
William Alley (1510–1570), Anglican prelate
William Alley (born 1936), American javelin thrower
William Nassau Alley (1808–1849), Irish methodist
Zeb Alley (1928–2013), American lawyer, lobbyist, and politician

Given name

Male
Alley Broussard (born 1983), American football player

Female
Alley Baggett (born 1973), American glamour model
Alley Mills (born 1951), American actress